The 1808 Pennsylvania gubernatorial election occurred on October 11, 1808. Incumbent governor Thomas McKean, a former Democratic Republican who had faced impeachment by members of his own party during the prior term, was not a candidate. Democratic-Republican candidate Simon Snyder, former Speaker of the Pennsylvania House of Representatives defeated Federalist candidate and former U.S. Senator James Ross to become Governor of Pennsylvania. Snyder, with the aid of a supportive press, campaigned as a "New School Democrat" and attempted to ally himself with James Madison. He painted the former McKean administration as elitist and advocated for popular democracy, governmental intervention in the economy, and infrastructural support for Western Pennsylvania counties.

Results

*Note: Although Spayd ran as a Federalist, Ross was the only Federalist to carry any counties, as shown on the map.

References

1808
Gubernatorial
Pennsylvania
November 1808 events